Toivo Antti Turtiainen (14 October 1883 – 12 September 1920) was a Finnish politician. He was born in Savonranta, and was a Member of the Parliament of Finland from 1919 until his death in 1920, representing the Social Democratic Party of Finland (SDP). 
Brother of Aino Kuusinen.

References

1883 births
1920 deaths
People from Savonlinna
People from Mikkeli Province (Grand Duchy of Finland)
Social Democratic Party of Finland politicians
Members of the Parliament of Finland (1919–22)